Medard Matogolo Kalemani (born 15 March 1968), commonly known as Medard Kalemani, is a Tanzanian lawyer and politician, who served as the Minister of Energy in the Tanzanian cabinet, in 2017-2021. Immediately prior to his appointment to his current cabinet position, he served as Deputy Minister of the combined energy and minerals ministry, which was split into two, with Angellah Kairuki, assuming the mining docket.

Background and education
He was born in Tanzania, on 15 March 1968. After studying in local primary and secondary schools, he entered the University of Dar es Salaam (UDSM), in 1993 to study law. He graduated from the UDSM with a Bachelor of Laws in 1996. He also holds a Master of Laws, awarded in 2002, by the University of Dundee, in Scotland. His Doctor of Philosophy was obtained from Bedford University, in the United Kingdom.

Career
His first job was as a Legal Manager with the United Nations High Commissioner for Refugees/International Rescue Committee, working in that capacity from 1997	until 1998. In 1999, he relocated to the Ministry of Energy and Minerals, serving as a Senior Legal Officer until 2006. From 2007 until 2013, Kalemani served as the General Counsel of the Millenium Challenge Account in Tanzania. In 2013, he transferred back to the energy and minerals ministry, as the Director of the Legal Services Department, serving in that capacity until 2015.

In 2015, he was elected to the Tanzanian parliament to represent the Chato Constituency in the Geita Region of the country. In the same year, he was appointed Deputy Minister of Mining and energy, serving in that capacity until October 2017 when he was appointed Minister of Energy.

See also
Parliament of Tanzania

References

External links
List of Cabinet Ministers of the Republic of Tanzania

Living people
1968 births
Chama Cha Mapinduzi MPs
Tanzanian MPs 2015–2020
Tanzanian MPs 2020–2025
Nominated Tanzanian MPs
Energy ministers
Government ministers of Tanzania
University of Dar es Salaam alumni
Alumni of the University of Dundee
Chama Cha Mapinduzi politicians